Detective Sergeant Denis O'Brien (17 June 1899 – 9 September 1942), sometimes called "Dinny O’Brien", was a veteran of the Irish War of Independence and the Irish Civil War. He joined the Garda Síochána in 1933 and was killed by the Anti-Treaty IRA in 1942.

Early life
Denis O'Brien was born at 3 Boatman's Lane, near Cork Street, Dublin, the son of Patrick O'Brien, a labourer, and Mary Anne O'Brien, née Kane. The O'Brien family were still living at Boatman's Lane at the time of the 1901 census, but by the 1911 census they had moved to Pim Street, near Usher's Quay, Dublin. He was educated at James Street school by the Congregation of Christian Brothers. As a 17-year-old, he fought in the 1916 Easter Rising with the Marrowbone Lane Garrison of the Irish Volunteers. Briefly imprisoned by the British Army at Richmond Barracks, O'Brien was released on account of his age. He joined the Irish Republican Army in 1917, eventually succeeding his brother Patrick as O.C. ("officer commanding") 'C' Company, 4th Battalion, Dublin Brigade. He commanded his company through the whole period up until the Anglo-Irish Treaty. During the Irish Civil War, Denis and his brothers joined the Anti-Treaty IRA and fought in the Four Courts. After his capture during the Battle of Dublin, Denis was interned at the Curragh Camp until 1924. He later served as an accountancy clerk with the Electricity Supply Board. He married Annie Cooney at St James' Catholic Church, Dublin on 12 April 1926.

Police career
In 1933, Éamon de Valera, the new President of the Executive Council of the Irish Free State, issued a call for IRA veterans to join the Gardaí. O'Brien joined the Garda Síochána on 9 August 1933 (with registration number 8288), and subsequently entered the Detective Branch section headed by Eamon Broy. Broy, a former Detective Sergeant in the G Division of the Dublin Metropolitan Police, had spied for Michael Collins during the Irish War of Independence. Among Irish republican legitimists, however, O'Brien and his colleagues were referred to as, "The Broy Harriers."

O'Brien was promoted to Detective Sergeant on 15 October 1937 and remained in the Gardaí when de Valera introduced a more Republican constitution in 1937 and abolished the Oath of Allegiance to the British Monarchy.

World War II
During the Second World War O'Brien was a Detective Sergeant in the Special Branch Division, which had its headquarters at Dublin Castle. The Special Branch Division was then largely tasked with hunting down foreign spies and members of the IRA, who were interned and held without trial in the Curragh Camp. De Valera's government regarded the collaboration of the IRA with the intelligence services of Nazi Germany as a serious threat to Irish neutrality and its national security.

According to historian Tim Pat Coogan, "An iron gloved approached to the IRA was the order of the day with vigorous raids and interrogations. As a result, relations between individual IRA men and the Special Branch became understandably strained, and the IRA, in its shattered and disorganised condition, came to regard the Special Branch as a greater enemy than the British Crown."

Assassination
At 9:45 am on 9 September 1942 at Ballyboden, Rathfarnham, County Dublin, O'Brien left his house and began getting into his car. Three IRA men, wearing trenchcoats and armed with Thompson sub machine guns, lay in wait for him as he drove out his drive and opened fire. The shots from the Thompson smashed the windows of his car but he was uninjured and he alighted and ran for cover to the gate but upon reaching it, he was shot by a single round to the head.  The fatal shot was from a volley from a second Thompson gun and fired by another IRA man secreted across the Ballyboden Road adjacent to Kerr's Sawmill.

Two of the assassins wrapped the Thompsons in their trenchcoats, mounted their bicycles, and rode towards Dublin. Future IRA Chief of Staff Charlie Kerins left on foot, leaving his bicycle behind.

According to author Tim Pat Coogan, "The shooting greatly increased public feeling against the IRA, particularly as the murder was carried out almost in full view of his wife. As she held her dying husband, she watched his assailants cycling past." 

Detective Sergeant Denis O'Brien was posthumously awarded the Scott Medal by the Commissioner of the Garda Siochana.

Aftermath
Two years later, Kerins was arrested in a pre-dawn raid and tried by court-martial for the murder of Detective Sergeant O'Brien. At a special military tribunal in Collins Barracks, Dublin, Kerins was formally charged on 2 October 1944 for the "shooting at Rathfarnham of Detective Dinny O'Brien". According to Coogan, "At the end of his trial, the president of the Military Court delayed sentence until later in the day to allow Kerins, if he wished, to make an application whereby he might have avoided the capital sentence. When the court resumed, Kerins said: "You could have adjourned it for six years as far as I am concerned, as my attitude towards this Court will always be the same." He thus deprived himself of the right to give evidence, to face cross examination, or to call witnesses.

After Kerins' fingerprints were identified on the bicycle which was left at the crime scene, he was found guilty, and sentenced to death by hanging. The sentence was carried out by British chief executioner Albert Pierrepoint, who was regularly employed for such occasions by the Irish State, at Mountjoy Prison on 1 December 1944, in spite of numerous calls for clemency.

Archie Doyle, who is also alleged to have been in command of the IRA hit squad during the killing of O'Brien, died in 1980.

See also
 List of Irish police officers killed in the line of duty

References

External links
 Garda Siochana Roll of Honour
 Detective Sergeant Denis O'Brien – From the Official Website for the Garda Siochana

Irish Republican Army (1919–1922) members
Irish Republican Army (1922–1969) members
Garda Síochána officers
1942 deaths
People of the Irish Civil War (Anti-Treaty side)
Garda Síochána officers killed in the line of duty
Deaths by firearm in Ireland
1899 births
1942 murders in the Republic of Ireland